Eswatini (previously known as Swaziland) has competed in thirteen Commonwealth Games, with their first attendance being in 1970. They have won four medals, three in boxing and one in athletics. Their first medal was a bronze medal in the men's marathon, won by Richard Mabuza in 1974.

Medals

References

 
Nations at the Commonwealth Games